Far Breton (also Breton far) is a traditional cake or dessert from the Brittany region in France. Its base is similar in composition to a clafoutis batter: a flan-style eggs-and-milk custard with flour added. Prunes or raisins are common additions. Numerous recipes available at popular websites suggest soaking the dried fruits in alcohol; this is not traditional practice but makes an interesting variation. Far Breton as served in Brittany is often cooked to a much more "burned" appearance than online recipes indicate; the top of the custard appears nearly blackened rather than golden-brown.

References

Custard desserts
Breton cuisine